King of the Corner is a 2004 American independent comedy-drama film featured at the Newport Film Festival. It stars Peter Riegert and Isabella Rossellini, and includes Eric Bogosian, Eli Wallach, Beverly D'Angelo and Rita Moreno. It was released in 2004. Peter Riegert also co-wrote and directed the film.

It is a story of a middle-age man going through family and work issues.

References

External links
 
http://www.rottentomatoes.com/m/10005192-king_of_the_corner/
The New York Times Movies

2004 films
American independent films
2004 comedy-drama films
American comedy-drama films
2004 comedy films
2004 drama films
2004 independent films
2000s English-language films
2000s American films